The president of the People's Democratic Republic of Algeria is the head of state and chief executive of Algeria, as well as the commander-in-chief of the Algerian People's National Armed Forces.

History of the office

The Tripoli Program, which served as Algeria's constitution when it won its war for independence from France in 1962, established the president as the head of state with a prime minister assisting in the operation of government.  Internal political maneuvering resulted in a new constitution in 1963 that abolished the prime minister position and devolved all executive power upon the office of the president. For the first four decades of independence government was controlled as a one-party state by the National Liberation Front. The presidency was held by a succession of FLN members; Ahmed Ben Bella, Houari Boumédienne and Chadli Bendjedid.  The constitution written in 1976 maintained the executive power of the Presidency, but the modifications of 1979 stripped the head of government status from the office.

Towards the end of the 1980s there was a liberalization of the FLN regime. However, when the Islamic Salvation Front won parliamentary elections in 1991, the military forced Chadli Bendjedid to dissolve the parliament and resign on 11 January 1992.  The military declared a state of emergency and took over government of the country, establishing a five-member High Council of State.  The council appointed a president, Muhammad Boudiaf, to take office for a three-year term to facilitate a transfer back to normal elections for the office. However Boudiaf was assassinated, and succeeded by Ali Kafi. Meanwhile, the country descended into a period of civil war, between the military government and Islamic guerrillas.  Kafi was replaced in 1994 by Liamine Zéroual, who called the first of these elections in 1995, winning the full five-year term easily in disputed in election as the civil war was continuing. He called another early election in 1999, with the Islamic insurgency mostly suppressed. Abdelaziz Bouteflika won this election after all other candidates dropped out.  He won re-election on 8 April 2004, in elections that were also disputed, won again in 2009, relatively unchallenged, and 2014; he declared his candidacy for a 5th term in the election scheduled for 18 April 2019, but, on 2 April 2019, he resigned before his 4th term ended, due to pressure from the military after protests.

As provided for under Article 102 of the Algerian Constitution, Abdelkader Bensalah, President of the Council of the Nation, became acting president of the country upon the resignation of Abdelaziz Bouteflika on 2 April 2019.  His term could last for a maximum of 90 days, until elections, in which he could not participate, were held.

The current president is Abdelmadjid Tebboune, who won the 2019 Algerian presidential election on 12 December and assumed the office on 19 December 2019.

Latest election

See also
 Politics of Algeria
 List of heads of state of Algeria
 Prime Minister of Algeria
 Vice President of Algeria
 Air transports of heads of state and government

References

External links
 Official website

 
Politics of Algeria
Algeria
1963 establishments in Algeria